Panchavarnaswamy Temple (An ancient Tamil temple)(பஞ்சவர்ணஸ்வாமி கோயில்) (usually Panjavarnaswamy Temple) is a Tamil temple dedicated to Shiva, located in Woraiyur, a neighborhood in the town of Tiruchirapalli in Tamil Nadu, India. Shiva is believed to portray five different colours, giving the name of the presiding deity, Panchavarnaswamy. Panchavarnaswamy is revered in the 7th century Tamil Saiva canonical work, the Tevaram, written by Tamil saint poets known as the tri-nayanars (Sambandar, Thirunavukkarasar, Sundar) (சம்பந்தர், திருநாவுக்கரசர், சுந்தரர், and classified as Paadal Petra Sthalam.

It has several inscriptions dating back to the Chola period. The temple has six daily rituals at various times from 5:30 a.m. to 8 p.m., and three yearly festivals on its calendar. The annual Srivari Brahmotsavam (prime festival) is attended by hundreds of thousands of devotees. The temple is maintained and administered by the Tamilnadu Religious and Charitable Endowments Department of the Government of Tamil Nadu.

Etymology and legend

The place is called Uraiyur or Tirumukkeswaram, was once the capital of Chola kings as noted to Greek traveller Ptolemy. Panchavarnaswamy, the presiding deity of the temple, derives its name from the word panchavarnam, meaning five colours. As per Hindu legend, Shiva is believed to have appeared for sage Udanga in five different colours in five parts of the day. The temple is also called as "Tirumukeechwaram"(திருமூக்கீச்சரம்) or "Kozhi". The 7th century Saiva canonical work Tevaram by Tirugnanasambandar mentions the place as "Tirumukeechwaram". 

As per Hindu legend, Shiva is believed to have appeared in five different colours and hence the presiding deity came to be known as Panchavarneswarar ("Lord of five colours"). Nagaraja, the serpent king was carrying the images of five different Lingams, which all got merged into one as the presiding deity at this temple. The temple is believed to have been worshipped by Garuda, sage Kathiru and wife of sage Kashyapa.

Architecture

Panchavarnaswamy temple complex has three prakarams (outer courtyard) and a five-tiered rajagopuram (gateway tower). The central shrine faces east and holds the image of Panchavarnaswamy (Shiva) in the form of lingam made of granite. The granite images of the deities Ganesha (son of Shiva and god of wisdom), Murugan (son of Shiva and god of war), Nandi (the bull and transport of Shiva) and Navagraha (nine planetary deities) are located in the hall leading to the sanctum. As in other Shiva temples of Tamil Nadu, the first precinct or the walls around the sanctum of Panchavarnaswamy has images of Dakshinamurthy (Shiva as the Teacher), Durga (warrior-goddess) and Chandikeswarar (a saint and devotee of Shiva). The second precinct is surrounded by granite walls.

There are eight historical inscriptions in the temple, which are recorded by Epigraphy India as 181-188 of 1907. One of them dated the fourth year of a ruling Chola king records a gift of the village Atigunakapaganallur to the maintenance of the temple. The historical introduction of Chola king Rajendra Chola I can be traced in the inscription. Another inscription on the north wall of the presiding deity during the seventh year of Raja Raja Chola I mentions Rajasraya-Chaturvedimangalam in Uraiyur-kurram, a subdivision in Keralankata-Valanadu. The temple is mentioned as Udaiyar tiurndaitalai Mahadeva at Tiru-uraiyur.

The epigraph 51 of 1890 on a rock called Cholamparai near Uraiyur, mentions a record of Tribhuvanachakravartin Tribhuvanavira-Vikramadeva.

Worship and Religious Practices

The temple is counted as one of the temples built on the banks of River Kaveri. The presiding deity is revered in the 7th century Tamil Saiva canonical work, the Tevaram, written by Tamil saint poets known as the Nayanars and classified as Paadal Petra Sthalam. 

The temple priests perform the puja (rituals) during festivals and on a daily basis. Like other Shiva temples of Tamil Nadu, the priests belong to the Shaiva sect that considers Shiva as the Supreme God. The temple rituals are performed six times a day; Ushathkalam at 5:30 a.m., Kalasanthi at 8:00 a.m., Uchikalam at 10:00 a.m., Sayarakshai at 5:00 p.m., Irandamkalam at 7:00 p.m. and Ardha Jamam at 8:00 p.m. Each ritual comprises four steps: abhisheka (sacred bath), alangaram (decoration), naivedyam (food offering) and dīpa ārādhanai or dīpārādhanā ( in Hindi )  (waving of lamps) for both Panchavarnaswamy and Amman. The worship is held amidst music with nadasvaram (pipe instrument) and tavil (percussion instrument), religious instructions in the Vedas (sacred texts) read by priests and prostration by worshippers in front of the temple mast.

Notes

References

External links

Hindu temples in Tiruchirappalli
Padal Petra Stalam